The first series of Downton Abbey comprises seven episodes, was broadcast in the UK from 26 September 2010, and explored the lives of the Crawley family and their servants from the day after the sinking of the RMS Titanic in April 1912 to the outbreak of the First World War on 4 August 1914. The ties between blood relations in family are an important part of the series. The series looks keenly at issues relating to class and privilege in a variety of aspects, such as the compassionate treatment of homosexuality seen with depictions of the character of Thomas Barrow.

Series overview
The first series is focused on the need for a male heir to the Grantham estate, and the troubled love life of Lady Mary as she attempts to find a suitable husband.  The device that sets the drama in motion is the fee tail or "entail" governing the (fictional) Earldom of Grantham, endowing both title and estate exclusively to heirs male and complicated by the dire financial state of the estate, the latter only resolved when the earl—then the heir apparent—married an American heiress.  As a condition of the marriage contract, her considerable fortune was contractually incorporated into the comital entail in perpetuity.  The earl and countess, who have three daughters and no son, arranged for their eldest daughter to marry her cousin, son of the then-heir presumptive.  The demise of both heirs in the sinking of the Titanic destroys the plans and brings into play a distant male cousin, Matthew Crawley, a solicitor from Manchester, as heir presumptive to Downton and the countess's fortune.  The series begins in early 1912 with the aftermath of the Titanic disaster and ends in late 1914, at the outbreak of World War I, and follows the lives of the Crawley family and their servants.

Cast

Main cast

Upstairs
Hugh Bonneville as Robert Crawley, Earl of Grantham
Elizabeth McGovern as Cora Crawley, Countess of Grantham
Michelle Dockery as Lady Mary Crawley
Laura Carmichael as Lady Edith Crawley
Jessica Brown Findlay as Lady Sybil Crawley
Maggie Smith as Violet Crawley, Dowager Countess of Grantham
Dan Stevens as Mr Matthew Crawley
Penelope Wilton as Mrs Isobel Crawley

Downstairs
Jim Carter as Mr Charles Carson; the butler
Phyllis Logan as Mrs Elsie Hughes; the housekeeper
Brendan Coyle as Mr John Bates; Lord Grantham's valet
Siobhan Finneran as Sarah O'Brien; Lady Grantham's maid
Joanne Froggatt as Miss Anna Smith; head housemaid
Thomas Howes as Mr William Mason; second footman
Robert James-Collier as Mr Thomas Barrow; first footman
Rose Leslie as Miss Gwen Dawson; a housemaid
Lesley Nicol as Mrs Beryl Patmore; the cook
Sophie McShera as Daisy Robinson; a kitchen maid

Recurring and guest cast

 Samantha Bond as Lady Rosamund Painswick; Lord Grantham's sister
 Robert Bathurst as Sir Anthony Strallan; Crawley family friend
 Allen Leech as Tom Branson; the Crawley family chauffeur
 Kevin Doyle as Joseph Molesley; Matthew Crawley's valet
 Brendan Patricks as The Hon. Evelyn Napier; suitor for Lady Mary
 David Robb as Dr Richard Clarkson; the Crawley family doctor
 Charlie Cox as Philip, The Duke of Crowborough; suitor of Lady Mary (episode 1)
 Jonathan Coy as George Murray; Lord Grantham's lawyer (episode 1)
 Nicky Henson as Charles Grigg; Carson's former colleague (episode 2)
 Theo James as Kemal Pamuk; Ottoman (Turkish) Embassy attaché (episode 3)

Episodes

Critical reception
The first series of Downton Abbey received universal and widespread critical acclaim, including commercial success.

On 14 July 2011, Downton Abbey received eleven nominations for the 63rd Primetime Emmy Awards winning six, including Outstanding Miniseries or Movie, Outstanding Directing for a Miniseries, Movie, or Dramatic Special for Brian Percival, Outstanding Writing for a Miniseries, Movie, or Dramatic Special for Julian Fellowes, and Outstanding Supporting Actress in a Miniseries or Movie for Dame Maggie Smith, who won again the following year for series 2.

At the 63rd Primetime Creative Arts Emmy Awards, the series won Outstanding Costumes for a Miniseries, Movie, or Special and Outstanding Cinematography for a Miniseries or Movie – both for "Episode One".

References

External links
 

2010 British television seasons
Downton Abbey series